Chandula Weeraratne (born 25 December 1995) is a Sri Lankan cricketer. He made his first-class debut for Lankan Cricket Club in Tier B of the 2018–19 Premier League Tournament on 31 January 2019.

References

External links
 

1995 births
Living people
Sri Lankan cricketers
Lankan Cricket Club cricketers
Place of birth missing (living people)